J. Fairfax McLaughlin may be:

 J. Fairfax McLaughlin (author), American author; see Pasquinade
 J. Fairfax McLaughlin (politician), New York politician; see 143rd New York State Legislature

See also
James McLaughlin (disambiguation)